Brandon Segal (born July 12, 1983) is a Canadian former professional ice hockey player. He most recently played under contract to the Thomas Sabo Ice Tigers of the Deutsche Eishockey Liga (DEL).

Playing career
As a youth, Segal played in the 1997 Quebec International Pee-Wee Hockey Tournament with a minor ice hockey team from North Delta, British Columbia.

Segal was originally drafted in the fourth round (102nd overall) by the Nashville Predators in the 2002 NHL Entry Draft from the Calgary Hitmen, and spent four seasons with their AHL affiliate, the Milwaukee Admirals.

On June 25, 2007, Segal was traded to the Anaheim Ducks for future considerations. He was then assigned to affiliate, the Portland Pirates to begin the 2007–08 season. After 54 games with the Pirates, Segal was traded by the Ducks along with a 7th round draft pick in the 2008 NHL Entry Draft to the Tampa Bay Lightning for Jay Leach on February 26, 2008. Segal continued in the AHL, playing for the Lightning's affiliate, the Norfolk Admirals.

In the 2008–09 season, Segal spent the majority of the season with the Admirals. In the late end of the season, Brandon made his NHL debut with the Lightning in a 3–1 defeat to the Pittsburgh Penguins on March 3, 2009.

On July 13, 2009, Segal signed a two-year contract with the Los Angeles Kings. After starting the 2009–10 season with the Manchester Monarchs of the AHL, he was recalled by the Kings and scored his first NHL goal on January 9, 2010 against Chris Mason of the St. Louis Blues.

On February 11, 2010, Segal was claimed off waivers by the Dallas Stars. Segal made an immediate impact with the Stars, scoring the game-winning goal and an assist in his debut against the Phoenix Coyotes on February 13, 2010.

On January 11, 2011, Segal cleared waivers and was assigned to play in the AHL with the Texas Stars.

On August 31, 2011, Segal signed a one-year, two-way contract with the Chicago Blackhawks. On September 26, 2011 the Blackhawks assigned Segal to their AHL affiliate, the Rockford IceHogs. On February 21, 2012, Segal was dealt by the Blackhawks, returning to his first NHL team the Tampa Bay Lightning in exchange for Matt Fornataro from the Norfolk Admirals.

On July 11, 2012, Segal signed with the New York Rangers. Due to the lockout he was assigned directly to AHL affiliate, the Connecticut Whale, for the beginning of the season. Upon a resolution to the lockout, Segal was recalled by the Rangers for the shortened 2012–13 season and featured in the opening night 3-1 defeat to the Boston Bruins on January 19, 2013. It was his only game for the Rangers before he was returned to the AHL with the Whale.

On August 20, 2013, Segal continued his journeyman career, signing a one-year two way contract as a free agent with the Washington Capitals. In 63 games, Segal contributed with 17 goals and 44 points with the Capitals AHL affiliate, the Hershey Bears in the 2013–14 season.

Segal signed his first contract abroad on a two-year deal in the Kontinental Hockey League with Croatian club, KHL Medveščak Zagreb on July 8, 2014. In the 2014–15 season, Segal was unable to lead the attack in Zagreb as expected and produced only 25 points in 54 games as the club missed the post-season.

On May 26, 2015, Segal left Croatia mid-contract to sign in the German league with the Thomas Sabo Ice Tigers of the DEL on a two-year deal.

Career statistics

Regular season and playoffs

International

References

External links

1983 births
Calgary Hitmen players
Canadian ice hockey right wingers
Chicago Blackhawks players
Connecticut Whale (AHL) players
Dallas Stars players
Hershey Bears players
Ice hockey people from British Columbia
KHL Medveščak Zagreb players
Living people
Los Angeles Kings players
Manchester Monarchs (AHL) players
Milwaukee Admirals players
Nashville Predators draft picks
New York Rangers players
Norfolk Admirals players
People from Richmond, British Columbia
Portland Pirates players
Rockford IceHogs (AHL) players
Tampa Bay Lightning players
Texas Stars players
Thomas Sabo Ice Tigers players
Canadian expatriate ice hockey players in Croatia
Canadian expatriate ice hockey players in Germany